Social-National Party may refer to:

 Social-National Party (France)
 Social-National Party of Ukraine